AVRO, short for Algemene Vereniging Radio Omroep ("General Association of Radio Broadcasting"), was a Dutch public broadcasting association operating within the framework of the Nederlandse Publieke Omroep system. It was the first public broadcaster in the Netherlands. In 2014 AVRO merged with fellow broadcaster TROS to form AVROTROS.

History

On 8 July 1923, Hilversumsche Draadlooze Omroep was launched by the Nederlandsche Seintoestellen Fabriek (in English: Dutch Transmitter Factory) under supervision of Willem Vogt. On 21 July 1923, it provided the very first regular radio broadcast in the Netherlands. In 1927 it changed its name into Algemeene Nederlandsche Radio Omroep (ANRO), followed soon by a merger with Nederlandsche Omroep Vereeniging (NOV). On 28 December 1927, the two merged broadcasters continued as Algemeene Vereeniging Radio Omroep (A.V.R.O., in English: "General Association of Radio Broadcasting").

In 1938, AVRO sponsored what was the strongest chess tournament ever to be held, won by Paul Keres on tiebreak over Reuben Fine.

AVRO was historically associated with the liberal pillar, a fact reflected in its longtime slogan, "promoting freedom."

On 2 September 1999, AVRO adopted its fourth and last logo that consists of the "Avro" wordmark being made up of blue stripes, except the letter "o" that is made up by a blue ball.

On 7 September 2014, AVRO were merged with its fellow broadcaster TROS to create one company known as AVROTROS.

Radio channels
Under NPO Radio 4:

 AVRO Back to the Old School
 AVRO Baroque around the Clock (shut down 1 April 2016)
 AVRO Easy Listening
 AVRO Klassiek 
 AVRO Het beste van het beste
 AVRO Radio Festival Classique
 AVRO Steenen Tijdperk Fifties
 AVRO Steenen Tijdperk Sixties
 AVRO Ziel en Zaligheid
 AVRO Operette

Radio programmes
Arbeidsvitaminen

Television programmes
 Devil's Advocate
 EénVandaag (co-production with TROS)
 Gehaktdag
 Koefnoen
 Op zoek naar Evita
 Op zoek naar Joseph
 The Phone
 TopPop
 Wie is de Mol? (Dutch version of The Mole)

Presenters
These are the Current Presenters Went From AVROTROS
 Chantal Janzen (TV)
 Cornald Maas (TV)
 Gerard Ekdom (TV & Radio)
 Jan Steeman (Radio)
 Pia Dijkstra (TV & Radio)
 Sipke Jan Bousema (TV)

Announcers
 Netty Rosenfeld† (1951-1952)
 Heleen van Meurs (1953-1955)
 Mies Bouwman (1954-1955)
 Ageeth Scherphuis (1956-1966)
 Elizabeth Mooy (1959-1966, 1971–1976)
 Ilse Wessel † (1963-1969)
 Lonneke Hoogland (1964-1968)
 Ria Bremer (1966-1970)
 Viola Holt/Viola van Emmenes (1968-1969)
 Alice Oppenheim (1968-1975)
 Sonja van Proosdij (1969)
 Lous Haasdijk † (1969-1975)
 Ingrid Drissen (1974-1980)
 Jos van Vliet (1975-1976)
 Hans van der Togt (1976-1989)
 Ilona Hofstra (1977-1979)
 Patricia Messer (1979-1985)
 Jack van der Voorn (1983)
 Monique van der Sande (1983-1985)
 Ad Visser (1985-1989)
 Myrna Goossen (1985-1990)
 Simon Visser (1986)
 Roeland Kooijmans (1988-1991)
 Birgit E. Gantzert (1989-1992)
 Judith de Bruijn (1989-1992)
 Pauline Dekker (1990-1991)
 Humberto Tan (1991-1992)

Correspondents
 Link van Bruggen †  
 Jan Brusse † (1948-1985)
 Koen Corver
 Anton Foek
 Albert Milhado † (1945-1975)
 Peter Schröder † (1960-1984)
 Max Tak † (1945-1967)
 Fons van Westerloo (1976-1983)

References

Dutch public broadcasting organisations
Netherlands Public Broadcasting
Dutch-language television networks
Dutch companies established in 1927